Ayana Gray is an American author of young adult fiction. Her 2021 debut novel Beasts of Prey was a New York Times bestseller.

Biography 
Gray was born in Atlanta, Georgia, and moved to Little Rock, Arkansas with her family at age thirteen, attending Pulaski Academy. Gray received her Bachelor of Arts in political science and African and African-American Studies from the University of Arkansas in 2015.

Gray began writing her debut novel, Beasts of Prey, in May 2015, following her graduation. In July 2020, Gray sold Beasts of Prey and two accompanying books to Putnam Books for Young Readers, an imprint of Penguin Random House.

Beasts of Prey, the first installment in the eponymous trilogy, was published on September 28, 2021. The story takes place in a Pan-African inspired world and follows two Black teens named Koffi and Ekon as they venture into a magical jungle to find and hunt down an ancient monster. Beasts of Prey debuted at #4 on the New York Times bestseller list. In 2021, it was announced that the book would be adapted into a feature film by Netflix, with Clubhouse Pictures producing.

Personal life
Gray currently lives in Little Rock, Arkansas. She is a member of Alpha Kappa Alpha Sorority, Incorporated.

Bibliography

Beasts of Prey trilogy 

 Beasts of Prey (2021)
 Beasts of Ruin (2022)

Awards 
2022 Arkansas Center for the Book Selection
2022 Georgia Center for the Book Selection

References 

21st-century American novelists
American fantasy writers
Black speculative fiction authors
Women science fiction and fantasy writers
Living people
African-American women writers
Writers from Atlanta
University of Arkansas alumni
Novelists from Georgia (U.S. state)
Novelists from Arkansas
Writers from Little Rock, Arkansas
American women novelists
21st-century American women writers
African-American novelists
1993 births
Writers from Arkansas
Alpha Kappa Alpha members